Tarb may refer to:
Tarb, Iran, a village in Kohgiluyeh and Boyer-Ahmad Province, Iran
A character in Tokyo Mew Mew; see List of Tokyo Mew Mew characters